Robert Jacques may refer to:

 Robert Jacques (footballer, born 1947), French football player and manager
 Robert Jacques (footballer, born 1957), French football player and manager